Gustav Becker was an Austrian weightlifter. He competed in the men's heavyweight event at the 1924 Summer Olympics.

References

External links
 

Year of birth missing
Year of death missing
Austrian male weightlifters
Olympic weightlifters of Austria
Weightlifters at the 1924 Summer Olympics
Place of birth missing